The Nam Phong Formation, which correlates to the Indosinian III Unconformity, is a geological formation in Thailand.  It underlies the Khorat Group. It consists of resistant, red-brown micaceous sandstones, conglomerates, siltstones and mudstones of mainly fluvial origin. The sandstones are medium to very fine-grained and are usually calcareous. The conglomerates contain pebbles of quartz, brown and grey chert, and reddish brown siltstone. Cross bedding and plane-bed stratification are common in the sandstones and conglomerates. The sandstones and conglomerates make up approximately 30% of the formation. This sedimentary rock formation is found in Khon Kaen Province, Thailand.  It is of Norian to Rhaetian age (Upper Triassic) to (Lower Jurassic) age, and is notable for its fossils of early dinosaurs.

Vertebrate paleofauna 
Indeterminate prosauropod remains are present in Khon Kaen Province.

Correlations 
The formation has been correlated with the Lower Elliot Formation (Karoo Basin) and Forest Sandstone of Africa, the Caturrita Formation of the Paraná Basin in Brazil, the Laguna Colorada and Los Colorados Formations (Ischigualasto-Villa Unión Basin) of Argentina, the Chinle Formation of North America, the Trössingen Formation of the Keuper Group of Germany, and the Lower Dharmaram Formation of India.

See also 
 List of dinosaur-bearing rock formations

References

Bibliography 
 
  

Geologic formations of Thailand
Triassic System of Asia
Norian Stage
Rhaetian Stage
Jurassic System of Asia
Mesozoic Thailand
Sandstone formations
Conglomerate formations
Siltstone formations
Mudstone formations
Fluvial deposits
Fossiliferous stratigraphic units of Asia
Paleontology in Thailand
Formations